Uyyakondan Thirumalai Temple (also called Ujeevanathar temple, Karkudimalai or Thirumalainallur)) is a Hindu temple dedicated to the deity Shiva, located on the banks of Uyyakondan river, Trichy, in the South Indian state of Tamil Nadu. Shiva is worshipped as Uyyakondan, and is represented by the lingam. His consort Parvati is depicted as Anjanakshi Amman. The presiding deity is revered in the 7th century Tamil Saiva canonical work, the Tevaram, written by Tamil saint poets known as the Nayanars and classified as Paadal Petra Sthalam.

The temple complex covers four acres, constructed on a hillock . The temple has a number of shrines, with those of Uyyakondar and his consorts Maivizhi and Kanniyumaiyal, being the most prominent. All the shrines of the temple are enclosed in large concentric rectangular granite walls. The temple is approached by a flight of steps from the basement that houses the temple tank.

The temple has four daily rituals at various times from 6:00 a.m. to 8:30 p.m., and four yearly festivals on its calendar. The Brahmotsavam festival is celebrated during the day of the Panguni (March -April) is the most prominent festival.

The original complex is believed to have been built by Cholas. In modern times, the temple is maintained and administered by the Hindu Religious and Charitable Endowments Department of the Government of Tamil Nadu. The temple has inscriptions from the Chola period.

Legend

As per popular legend, near the temple of Tirukkadaiyur, there lived a sage named Mrikandu and his wife Marudmati. They were both devotees of Shiva and worshiped him day and night for many years, asking that he grace them with a child. After many years of penance, Shiva appeared to Mrikandu and Marudmati. He told them that he heard their prayers and would give them a choice: they could either have a gifted son who would live to only sixteen, or a son of low intelligence who would live a long life. Mrikandu and Marudmati chose the former, and were blessed with Markandeya, an exemplary son, destined to die at the age of sixteen.

As Markandeya grew, so did his devotion to Shiva.  As advised by his father, Markandeya worshipped the Shiva Lingam at Tirukkadaiyur, even bringing water from the Ganges to the temple via an underground passage. On the day he was destined to die, Yama, the deity of death, appeared with his noose to tie around the soul of Markandeya and take it with him. Markandeya sought refuge in the Uyyakondan temple and embraced the Siva Lingam and got relief in Thirukkadaiyur. Shiva appeared and warned Yama not to touch Markandeya, as he was under his protection. Yama refused to listen and threw the noose anyway, binding Markandeya and the Lingam together. Angered by Yama's extraordinary arrogance, Shiva kicked him and held him under his foot, making Yama inactive. Markandeya was blessed by Shiva to remain sixteen years old eternally. Shiva became known as "Kala-samhara" (Sanskrit: "Destroyer of Time") at this temple.

History
The temple is built in Sembian age of Cholas around 950 CE. There are many inscriptions in the temple. An inscription from the period of Rajaraja I indicates donation of a crown to the temple by Sembiyan Mahadevi during his 10th regnal year. The temple has inscriptions dating from Kulothunga Chola I (1070–1118 CE), that speaks of a separate community known as Rathakarar, a sect of expert carpenter skilled in the art of designing and making temple cars. The Uyyakondan Channel was built as a tributary by Rajaraja Chola to irrigate the lands near Tiruchirapalli. The temple was occupied by French and English forces during the siege of Trichonopoly (old Tiruchirapalli) in 1753-54.  After the war battle of Sugar-loaf rock, English Major Lawrence marched against the fortified temple and carried it by assault. In modern times, the temple is maintained and administered by the Hindu Religious and Charitable Endowments Department of the Government of Tamil Nadu.

Architecture
 
The temple is located in Uyyakondanmalai, a village on the outskirts of Trichy in the South Indian state of Tamil Nadu on the Trichy - Vayalur road. The temple is counted as one of the temples built on the banks of River Kaveri. The temple is reached by a flight of steps. The shrine of Vinayagar is located in a cut in the first ten steps and the other shrines are located on the hillock. The whole temple is fortified and the temple tank is located inside the fortification. The main deity of the temple faces western direction. There are two shrines of Goddess in the temple. There are four bodies of water associated with the temple, namely Ponnoli Odai, Kudamurutti, Gnavavi, Enkoru Kinaru and Narkonu Kinaru. The temple has an important sculpture of Jyesta devi. There are multiple sculptures on the pillars of the temple indicating various legends associated with Hinduism. The temple is designed so that sunlight falls directly on the first day of Tamil month of Thai on both Uyyakondar and Balambigai. There are different shrines and images in the first precinct around sanctum for Nalvar, Gajalakshmi, Jyestadevi, Navagraha, Bhairava, Surya and Saniswara.

Festivals and religious importance

The temple priests perform the puja (rituals) during festivals and on a daily basis. The temple rituals are performed four times a day; Kalasanthi at 8:00 a.m., Uchikalam at 12:00 a.m., Sayarakshai at 6:00 p.m,  and Arthajamam at 9:00 p.m.. Each ritual comprises four steps: abhisheka (sacred bath), alangaram (decoration), naivethanam (food offering) and deepa aradanai (waving of lamps) for Kachabeswarar and Anjanatchi. The nine-day Brahmotsavam during the Tamil month of Panguni and Shivaratri are the most important festivals of the temple.

The presiding deity is believed to have been worshipped by Narada, Markandeya, Karan and Arunagirinathar. The temple is revered in the 7th–8th century Saivite canonical literature, Tevaram, by all the three poets, namely, Appar, Campantar and Cuntarar. A Sri Lankan king is believed to have been blessed by the deity here.
  Cuntarar describes the feature of the deity as:

Notes

References

.
.
.
 
 
 
 

Padal Petra Stalam
Hindu temples in Tiruchirappalli
Fortified religious buildings and structures